Bo$$ may refer to:

 Boss (rapper), sometimes stylized as Bo$$, an American rapper 
 ”Boss” (Fifth Harmony song), a 2015 song stylised as "Bo$$"